Originating in historical Vedic religion, 'Pravargya' (Sanskrit प्रवर्ग्य), also known as 'Ashvina-pravaya', is an introductory or preliminary ceremony to the Soma Yajña (of which there are several kinds, including but not limited to, the five-day Agnishtoma Soma Yagya forming the basic model).  

In the Pravargya Yajña, an earthen pot is fashioned from clay dug up from the ground, placed on a fire-altar, and used to boil milk which is offered to the Ashvins, the twin Rigvedic gods of Ayurvedic medicine. 

As with all Vedic Period sacrificial ceremonies, the Pravargya Yajña is mystical in nature insofar as items, positions, actions, and words have indirect, symbolic meanings, rather than direct (i.e. exoteric) literal meanings (e.g. the pot represents the head of Vishnu which in turn represents the Sun). It is also typical in that numerous and complex rules must be strictly followed by participants to the smallest detail.

Although explanations of and instructions for the performance of the Pravargya Yagya are provided by various Vedic literature such as the Brahmanas, Aranyakas and Shrautasutras, those provided by the Shatapatha Brahmana of the White Yajurveda are particularly notable in Vaishnavism as the likely origin of the Varaha (boar) avatar of the Rigvedic God Vishnu.

Nomenclature and etymology

Pravargya 
'Pravargya' (Sanskrit प्रवर्ग्य) means ' a ceremony introductory to the Soma Yagya (at which fresh milk is poured into a heated vessel called, mahā-viira or gharma, or into boiling ghee)'. It is also similarly defined as a 'ceremony preliminary to the Soma Yagya'. The term seems to be derived from 'Pravarga' (प्रवर्ग), which means 'a large earthenware pot (used in the Pravargya ceremony)'. 'Pravargya' also means 'distinguished' and 'eminent'. Both words seem to be formed from the roots:

 '√pra', meaning 'forward, in front, on, forth'.
 '√vrj', meaning 'to twist off, pull up, pluck, gather', or 'to avert, remove'.

Mahāvīra Pot 
According to A.B. Keith and A.A. Macdonell 'Mahāvīra' (महावीर)  'is the name in the later Samhitās and the Brāmaṇas of a large earthenware pot which could be placed on the [sacrificial] fire, and which was especially employed at the introductory Soma ceremony called Pravargya'. 

'Mahāvīra' literally translates to  'great hero', 'thunderbolt', and 'white horse' (which seem to relate to GodKing Indra). It also translates to 'archer', which is particularly notable as two (linked) legends relating to this pot in the Pravargya ceremony concerns Makha and Vishnu respectively being decapitated by their bows (i.e. in the Shatapatha Brahmana, the Mahāvīra earthen pot represents the decapitated head of Vishnu).

Makha 
According to the Monier-Williams Sanskrit Dictionary, 'Makha' (मख) means 'cheerful, sprightly, vigorous, active, restless', or ' a feast, festival, any occasion of joy or festivity', or 'a Yajña, sacrificial oblation'. Makha is also the name of a nakshatra (star).

Varna 
The class or 'Varna' (वर्ण) system also influenced the proceedings of the Pravargya ceremony. According to the Monier-Williams Sanskrit dictionary, 'Varna' has many different meanings. Generally, it is used to refer to the forms, shapes, appearances, categorisations and arrangements of things. This includes of physical objects, living beings, letters, words, sounds, musical notes, and arrangements of songs and poems. A more specific definition given by the dictionary is also 'class of men, tribe, order, caste... [which is] properly applicable to the four principal classes described in Manu's code, viz. Brāhmans, Kshatriyas, Vaiśyas, and Sūdras ; the more modern word for 'caste' being jāti'. The relation between the varna and caste systems is discussed in more detail below.

Key deities mentioned

Vishnu 
Vishnu, stated to be synonymous with the Yagya(Yagyo Vai Vishnuh Yajurveda), is decapitated in a legend relating to the Mahāvīra earthen Pot used in the Pravargya Yagya (e.g. Shatapatha Brahmana 14.1.1).

Synonymous with Krishna, Vishnu is the "preserver" in the Hindu triad (Trimurti) and is revered as the supreme being In Vaishnavism. Also stated to be synonymous with the Yagya (e.g. in the Shatapatha Brahmana, see below), Vishnu is particularly notable for adopting various incarnations (avatars such as Varaha, Rama, and Krishna), time to time in every Yug to preserve and protect dharmic principles whenever the world is threatened with evil, chaos, and destructive forces.

The Ashvins 
In the Pravargya ceremony, a Mahāvīra earthen pot is made and used to boil milk as an oblation to the Ashvins.

W.J. Wilkins states that the 'Asvins are regarded as the physicians of the gods; and are declared to be able to restore to health, the sick, the lame, and the emaciated amongst mortals. They are the special guardians of the slow and backward; the devoted friends of elderly women who are unmarried. They are said to preside over love and marriage, and are implored to being together hearts that love... the Asvins are invoked for "offspring, wealth, victory, destruction of enemies, the preservation of the worshippers themselves, of their houses and cattle'.

In the legend of Vishnu's decapitation, the Yagya is stated to have begun without the Ashvins. Wilkins relates another legend in the Shatapatha Brahmana (4.1.5) that leads to the Ashvins joining the Yagya, and as physicians, using their power to replace the head of Vishnu/Makha as the head of the Yagya (i.e. the Pravargya, itself). Their request to the gods for this was to be granted oblations at the Yagya, which was accepted (hence boiled milk is offered to them in the Pravargya Yagya). The story related by Wilkins is that after attempting and failing twice to take away Sukanya, the young wife of an elderly Rishi called Chyavana, she tells the Ashvins one of the reasons she won't leave her husband for them is because they are imperfect, but will only tell them why after they make her husband young again. They agree, and so she 'tells the Asvins that they are imperfect because they have not been invited to join the other gods in a great Yagya that was to be celebrated at Kurukshetra (where Vishnu/Makha is later decapitated). The Asvins proceed to this Yagya, and, asking to be allowed to join in it, are told they cannot do so, because they have wandered familiarly among men, performing cures. In reply to this, the Asvins declared that the gods were making a headless Yajña. The gods inquiring how this can be, the Asvins reply, "Invite us to join you, and we will tell you." To this the gods consented'.

Indra 
Just as in the Rigveda, Indra is stated to become 'Makhavan' (1.3.43), in the Shatapatha Brahmana it is also stated that Indra 'became Makhavat (possessed of makha)' in a legend relating to the Mahāvīra earthen pot made in the Parvargya Yajña (i.e. the decapitation of Vishnu). Indra is also stated to be the 'slayer of Makha' in the Taittiriya Samhita of the Black Yajurveda (3.2.4). Should the Mahāvīra be broken during the Yajña, Indra is invoked for atonement (Pañcaviṃśa Brāhmaṇa, see below).

In the Vedas, Indra is the king of Svarga (Heaven) and the Devas. He is the deity of the heavens, lightning, thunder, storms, rains, river flows, and war. Indra is the most referred to deity in the Rigveda. He is celebrated for his powers, and the one who kills the great symbolic evil (malevolent type of Asura) named Vritra who obstructs human prosperity and happiness. Indra destroys Vritra and his "deceiving forces", and thereby brings rains and the sunshine as the friend of mankind.

Makha 

In the Parvargya Yajña, the Mahāvīra earthen pot made from clay is referred to as 'Makha'. In a legend relating to the Mahāvīra, Makha (in the Pañcaviṃśa Brāhmaṇa) or Makha-Vishnu (in the Shatapatha Brahmana and Taittiriya Aranyaka) is decapitated. The pot is referred to as Makha's head, which at the end of the ceremony is used as the symbolic head of a man's body (see below). 

The above quote from the Taittiriya Samhita concerns a Soma Yajña to Rudra. Other references to the head of Makha are all in the Taittiriya Samhita (e.g.1.1.8, 1.1.12, and 4.1.5, as well as that quoted above), and all seem to be in relation to Agni, the fire god.

A.A. Macdonell states that 'Makha appears to designate a person in two passages of the Rigveda [9.101.13. where the Bhrgus are mentioned as chasing Makha], but in neither passage does the context explain who he was. Probably a demon of some kind is meant. In the later Samhitas [Vajasaneyi Samhita (White Yajurveda) 11.57; 37.7; Taittiriya Samhita, 1.1.8.1, 3.2.4.1] mention is also made of the 'head of Makha,' an expression which has become unintelligible to the Brahmanas [Shatapatha Brahmana 14.1.2.17]. 

In regards to this ambiguity, S. Shrava states that 'Innumerable manuscripts of the valuable [Vedic] literature have been lost due to atrocities of the rulers and invaders, ravages of time, and utter disregard and negligence. These factors contributed to the loss of hundreds of manuscripts. Once their number was more than a few hundred. Had these [including Brahmanas] been available today the ambiguity in the interpretation of Vedic hymns could not have crept in'.

Brihat Parasara Hora Sastra 
Notably, according to the Brihat Parasara Hora Sastra (an important book on Vedic Astrology), Makha is a nakshatra (star). The presiding deity of that star is also stated to be the Sun, which is notable given the sun is regarded as the 'soul of all' (i.e. 'best', as in best of or 'head' of the Yagya), and the decapitated head of Vishnu in various Brahmanic legends is stated to become the sun (see below).

Summary of the ritual

Somayaga 
R.L. Kashyap states that 'Somayaga is a general name for those Yagya in which libations of the soma juice are offered in the duly consecrated fire. There are seven types of Soma Yajnas namely, agnishtoma, atyagnishtoma, ukthya, shodashi, vajapeya, atirata and aptoryama... Agnishtoma is a typical Somayaga, forming the prakriti or model for other Soma Yagya'. Kashyap also details the 5-day Agnishtoma rite, in which the Pravargya ceremony within it is performed on the third and fourth days.

The Somyagyas are still performed. Here is the list of various somyagyas held in recent time.

Pravargya 
The Pravargya rite is complex and involves following numerous strict rules in regards to timing, objects used, placements, movements, actions, and what is said. The summaries given below are very much simplified. Kashyap states that 'The Pravargya must be commenced on the day of the new or full moon, or on a day in the wane when the moon is in an auspicious nakshatra'.

U.M. Vesci states that the Pravargya ritual has two distinct parts:

 At its beginning, the Mahāvīra earthen pots are prepared, and the milk boiled in them are offered to the Ashvins. This is repeated in the evening for three consecutive days. 
 At its conclusion, the implements used in this ritual, particularly the Mahāvīra are carried in procession to the fire-altar (uttaravedi) and buried there.

A.B. Keith states that from 'clay chosen from a pit east of the Ahavaniya fire, to which a horse leads the way, a Mahavira pot is made, a span high, two spare pots, and various other utensiles. A stool of Munja grass is also made as a throne for the pot. The pot is heated, the milk of a cow and a goat is poured in. Finally, the hot drink is offered to the Asvins, and two Rauhina cakes are also offered in the morning to the day, in the evening to the night. At the outset of the ceremony the wife of the conductor is made to cover her head, but she joins with the rest at the close in the finale of the Saman which is sung. At the end the offering utensils are arranged so as to make up the semblance of a man, the three Mahavira vessels marking the head, and so on... The pot is covered with a golden plate, which can be nothing else than a symbol of fire or the sun, the pot glows, the milk, which in its whiteness is a sun symbol, boils with heat. The Yagya by drinking as usual a share of the milk thus gains power at the same time as the sun is strengthened'.

S. Ketkat agrees, elaborating that at the Pravargya ceremony 'a cauldron [i.e. the Mahāvīra earthen pot] is made red-hot on the sacrificial fire, to represent symbolically the sun; in this cauldron milk is then boiled and offered to the Asvins. The whole celebration is regarded as a great mystery. At the end of it the sacrificial utensils are so arranged that they represent a man: the milk-pots are the head, on which a tuft of sacred grass represents the hair; two milking-pails represent the ears, two little gold leaves the eyes, two cups the heels, the flour sprinkled over the whole the marrow, a mixture of milk and honey the blood, and so on. The prayers and formulae naturally correspond with the mysterious ceremonies'.

Vedic literature cited 
The Shrautasutras have not been cited in this article, in part due to difficulty in finding English translations. Instead, English translations of Brahmanas and Aranyakas containing details of the Pravargya ceremony have been cited; these constitute Sruti literature of the Vedas as much as the Samhitas (hymns and mantras).

The Brahmanas 
The Samhitas of the Vedas are generally concerned with hymns and mantras, recited during sacrificial ceremonies such as the pravargya. The Brahmanas are generally commentaries on the Samhitas and provide instructions on the performance of the sacrificial ceremonies. Sharva states that in 'the brahmana literature this word ['brahmana'] has been commonly used as detailing the ritualism related to the different Yagya or yajnas... The known recensions [i.e. schools or Shakhas] of the Vedas, all had separate brahmanas. Most of these brahmanas are not extant.... [Panini] differentiates between the old and the new brahmanas... [he asked] Was it when Krishna Dvaipayana Vyasa had propounded the Vedic recensions? The brahmanas which had been propounded prior to the exposition of recensions by [Vyasa] were called as old brahmanas and those which had been expounded by his disciples were known as new brahmanas'.

The Aranyakas 
J. Dowson states that 'Aranyaka' means 'belonging to the forest' as this type of text is intended to 'expound the mystical sense of the [sacrificial] ceremonies, discuss the nature of God [etc.]. They are attached to the Brahmanas, and [are] intended for study in the forest by brahmanas who have retired from the distractions of the world'. Although the Aranyaka texts are generally best known for containing Upanishads, the Taittiriya Aranyaka is notable for also providing details on the performance of the Parvargya ceremony, which have been published separately as the 'Pravargya Brahmana'.

Rigveda

Aitareya Brahmana 

A.B. Keith states  it 'is certainly the case that the two Brahmanas [the Aitareya and Kausitaki] represent for us the development of a single tradition, and there must have been a time when there existed a single Bahrvea text... the Soma Yagya alone forms the real subject of the [Aitareya] book'. The above-quoted verse itself explains why the Ashvins are offered an oblation in the Pravargya ceremony (i.e. putting together or 'healing' the Mahāvīra Pot from the clay dug up), and the process of gathering itself may link to the name 'Pravargya' (i.e. as above, the root-word '√vrj', means 'to pull up, pluck, gather').

The Pravargya Yagya is itself is detailed in Pancika (book) 1, Adhyaya (chapter) 4, verses 1-22. The overall placement of the Pravargya as an early or introductory ceremony of the overall Soma Yagya is (Pancika II, Adhyaya III onwards is not detailed here):

Kauṣītaki Brahmana 

A.B. Keith states about the Kauṣītaki Brahmana that 'the first four Adhyayas cover fully enough for a Brahmana the Agnyadhana, the Agnihotra, the new and full moon Yagyas, and then follows a section on the function of the Brahman priest before the seventh Adhyaya carries us to the discussion of the Soma Yagya with occupies the rest of the book'. The extensive and elaborate Soma Yagya is thus detailed throughout Adhyayas 7-30 (i.e. 23 of 30 chapters); the Pravargya Yagya is itself is detailed Adhyaya 8, verses 3–7. The overall placement of the Pravargya as an introductory part of the overall Soma Yagya is (Adhyaya IX onwards is not detailed here):

Samaveda

Pañcaviṃśa Brāhmaṇa 

C. Majumdar states that the Panchavimsha Brahmana 'is one of the oldest and most important of Brahmanas... and includes the Vratyastoma, a ceremony by which people of non-Aryan stock could be admitted into the Aryan family'. R. Pandey elaborates, adding that 'According to the scriptures, persons [also] outcasted for nonperformance [i.e. of Yagya] were eligible to re-admission into the Aryan fold after performing the Vratyastoma Yagya'.

In terms of content, the Pañcaviṃśa Brāhmaṇa seems to focus on numerous other sacrificial rites (e.g. the Vratyastoma), rather than the Soma Yagya, of which the Pravargya ritual is an early part. However, of the two direct references found, the above-quoted verse from prapathaka (chapter) 9, Adhyaya (section) 10 entitled 'Expiations for various occasions' instructs the performers of the Pravargya ritual of what to do should one or more of the Mahāvīra pot(s) break in order to atone and continue the Yagya.

Makha decapitated 

This seems to be made in reference to Indra slaying Makha as mentioned in the Taittiriya Samhita (3.2.4) of the Black Yajurveda. The above-quote from the Panchavimsha Brahmana is particularly notable for three reasons (all detailed below). First, altered versions of this exact legend are contained in the Shatapatha Brahmana (White Yajurveda) and the Taittiriya Aranyaka (Black Yajurveda) where it is Vishnu that completes the Yagya and is decapitated, although He is still referred to as Makha in the Pravargya ritual. Second (again, as detailed below), the head is symbolically the highest, best, or most important, and thus the Pravargya ceremony as the head of the (Soma) Yagya is the highest, best, or most important part of it. And third, again, the word 'Mahāvīra' can also be translated as 'archer' (see above), hence the possible presence of a bow.

Yajurveda

White Yajurveda: Shatapatha Brahmana 
J. Eggeling states that 'The fourteenth kânda, up to the beginning of the Brihad-âranyaka, is entirely taken up with the exposition of the Pravargya, an important, though optional and subsidiary, ceremony performed on the Upasad-days of Soma-Yagya... the preparation of a hot draught of milk and ghee, the Gharma, which the Yagya has to take, after oblations have been made thereof to various deities, the whole rite is treated with a considerable amount of mystic solemnity calculated to impart to it an air of unusual significance. A special importance is, however, attached to the rough clay pot, used for boiling the draught, and manufactured and baked in the course of the performance itself; it is called Mahâvîra, i.e. the great man or hero, and Samrâg, or sovereign lord, and is made the object of fervid adoration as though it were a veritable deity of well-nigh paramount power. Although the history of this ceremony is somewhat obscure, the place assigned to it in the Soma-ritual would lead one to suppose that its introduction must have taken place at a time when the main procedure of the Soma-Yagya had already been definitely settled'.

Seemingly self-contained rather than presented as a part of the Soma Yagya, the structure of Khanda 14 (the last book) of the Shatapatha Brahmana is:

Vishnu decapitated 

The above-quoted account from the Shatapatha Brahmana seems to be an altered and elaborated version of the same legend from the Panchavimsha Brahmana. The most notable changes are that Vishnu is present at the Yagya, and the bow-string snaps and decapitates Him this time as a result of ants gnawing at it. As mentioned before, the word 'Mahāvīra' can also be translated as 'great hero' and 'archer' (see above). As noted earlier, there is also a reference to Indra slaying Makha as mentioned in the Taittiriya Samhita (3.2.4) of the Black Yajurveda, from which this legend may be derived. 

The legend given here is that 'the gods Agni, Indra, Soma, Makha, Vishnu, and the [Visvedevas], except the two Asvins, performed a sacrificial session', which was first attained by Vishnu, hence 'he became the most excellent of the gods'. Upadika ants then agreed with the other gods to gnaw at the bowstring of Vishnu while He rested his head on the Bow, in exchange for the boon to 'find water even in the desert' (as 'all food is water').

The Gharma (hot beverage offered as an oblation) is named after the sound of Vishnu's head hitting the ground (which 'on falling became yonder sun'), and 'inasmuch as he [Vishnu] stretched out (pra-vrig) on the ground, therefrom the Pravargya (took its name)'. The body of Vishnu is encompassed by Indra, who possessed by His glory 'became Makhavat (possessed of makha)'. Vishnu is then divided into three parts, with Agni receiving the first (morning) portion, Indra the second (midday) portion, and the remaining Visvedevas the third portion.

Digging up clay to form Makha's head 

As illustrated, as the clay is dug up and fashioned into Mahāvīra pots, the participant refers to the Vajasaneyi Samhita of the White Yajurveda, specifically Book 37, Verse 3 (i.e. 'Vâg. S. XXXVII, 3') to state it – representing the head of Vishnu – is the head of Makha:

Symbolism of Makha's head 

The above quote shows that symbolically, the head is associated with what is 'higher' and therefore what is best or of greatest importance. This is why the Mahāvīra Pot symbolically represents the head of Vishnu in the Shatapatha Brahmana. Particularly as Vishnu is explicitly stated to be 'the Yagya' in the Brahmanas (e.g. Shatapatha Brahmana 1.7.4.20, 1.1.4.9, 3.2.1.38, 3.6.3.3, 5.2.3.6, 5.4.5.1, 5.4.5.18, 11.4.1.4, 12.5.4.11, 14.1.1.13, and 11.4.1.4), the head of Vishnu is thus the best or highest part of it.

A more explicit account of the symbolic importance of the head is however provided in the first book of this Brahmana (1.4.5.5), which states 'the head (siras) represents excellence (srî), for the head does indeed represent excellence: hence, of one who is the most excellent (sreshtha) of a community, people say that he is 'the head of that community'.'

Legend of the Boar (Varaha) 

As illustrated, the above brief legend is given in respect to digging up the clay to make the Mahāvīra pots as part of the Pravargya Yagya. The participant  again refers to Vajasaneyi Samhita of the White Yajurveda, this time specifically Book 37, Verse 5 (i.e. 'Vâg. S. XXXVII, 5'):

N Aiyangar believes that Book 37 of the Vajasaneyi Samhita, cited in the ceremony, may be the origin of the Earth being lifted by the boar (i.e. earth lifted by oblations / Yagya). Directly relating to this, S. Ghose adds that the 'first direct idea of the boar as an incarnation of Vishnu performing the specific task of rescuing the earth is mentioned in the Satapatha Brahmana... the nucleus of the story of the god rescuing the earth in the boar-shape is found here'. A.B. Keith agrees, repeating that this 'boar, which is called Emusa from its epithet emusa, fierce, in the Rigveda, is stated...to have raised up the earth from the waters [in the Shatapatha Brahmana]'.

Black Yajurveda: Taittiriya Aranyaka 

The Pravargya Yajna is not detailed in the Taittiriya Brahmana, but rather the Aranyaka attached to it. In respect to the above quote, a more complete (and different) translation is provided below in respect to the decapitation of Vishnu relating to the Mahāvīra earthen pot used in ritual.

R. Mitra states that the Taittiriya Aranyaka is 'by far the largest of the Aranyakas. It extends altogether to ten prapāṭhakas or 'Great Lessons', i.e. books or chapters, of which the last four are Upanishads, and the first six, are Aranyaka strictly so-called'. In regards to the Pravargya rite, prapāṭhaka (chapter) 4 provides the mantras to be used, and prapāṭhaka (chapter) 5 details the performance of the ceremony itself:

Makha / Vishnu decapitated 

This, again, seems to be another altered version of the same legend found in the Panchavimsha Brahmana (Samaveda) and Shatapatha Brahmana (White Yajurveda). This version – likely later than the Shatapatha as it is contained in an Aranyaka, a type of text attached to Brahmanas, which are in turn attached to the Samhitas – is particularly notable for providing much additional clarity in respect to the mystical nature of the Pravargya ceremony. Again, 'Mahāvīra' means 'great hero' and 'archer', both of which are explicitly mentioned here, as is digging up the earth, and why the milk boiled in the Mahāvīra earthen pots are offered as libations to the Asvins in the Pravargya. The above quote also seems, like the Shatapatha, to imply Makha and Vishnu are synonymous.

Influence of the Varna System

Varna vs caste 

The Varna System refers to the general division of Vedic society into four classes: Brāhmans (priestly class), Kshatriyas (warrior and administrative class, including royalty), Vaiśyas (merchant class), and Sūdras (labouring class). To understand the influence of this Varna system in the Pravargya ceremony, it is first necessary to differentiate it from the modern caste system. As evidenced below, the varna and caste systems are not the same; only 'varna' is a Sanskrit word, and unlike the caste system, the varna system allowed both for movement between the classes and for non-Aryans to become Aryans (Aryans could also become outcastes and no longer considered Aryan). 

First, whereas 'varna' (वर्ण) is a Sanskrit word with a broad range of meanings relating to forms and arrangements, 'caste' is not, having originated from the Portuguese word casta''', which unlike 'varna', specifically refers to race. Thus, the varna system of class (e.g. based on occupation) is not the caste system of race.

Second, whereas the modern caste system is rigid and hereditary, P. Mitra states about the Varna system that there 'are differences of opinion – whether trades and professions of these [four] classes led to the formation of castes in the later period. But professions were not hereditary, [and] rather could be followed by any Aryan member.''' Had the caste system developed into rigid form in the vedic period then surely there would have been the mention of caste in the Rigveda... it [the caste system] did not develop out of the four Aryan varnas, and the two systems [i.e. varna and caste] have never been thoroughly harmonized'.

Third, whereas the modern caste system does not allow non-Aryans to become Aryans, the varna system does, as proven by Vedic literature such as the Panchavimsha Brahmana of the Samaveda (see above).

Pandey also states that 'in times of distress the members of the higher castes could adopt the occupations of the lower caste. But the members of the lower caste were not allowed to follow the occupations of the higher castes'. However, this assertion seems to be contradicted by S.R. Bakshi, who states the Brahmin 'author of the Aitareya Brahmana [of the Rigveda], Mahidasa, had a Sudra mother, while the Rishi, Kavasha Aliusha, was born of a Dasi [i.e. a servant, concubine or dancing girl]'.  However, A. Sharma and R. Bharati question whether Mahidasa was a sudra as 'far fetched'. There are other examples of Sudra Brahmins and Rishis,  and it is notable that the mythical sage Narada Muni was also the son of a maidservant initiated by Brahmins (e.g. Bhagavata Purana 1.6.6).

Exclusion of Ṥūdras 
According to A.B. Keith and A.A. Macdonell at 'the Pravargya (introductory Soma) rite the performer is not allowed to come in contact with a Ṥūdra, who here [in the Pancavimsa Brahmana], as in the Kathaka Samhita [of the Black Yajurveda] is reckoned as excluded from a share in the Soma-draught'.

References 

Yajna